Laosia is a genus of flowering plants belonging to the family Podostemaceae.

Its native range is Indo-China.

Species:
 Laosia ramosa Koi, Won & M.Kato

References

Podostemaceae
Malpighiales genera